Ronald Smith (born 7 June 1936) is an English former footballer who played on the left-wing. He scored 62 goals in 426 appearances over a thirteen-year career.

Failing to make the grade at Liverpool, he transferred to Bournemouth & Boscombe Athletic in 1959. He spent two years with the club before moving to Crewe Alexandra in July 1961. He helped Crewe to win promotion out of the Fourth Division in 1962–63, before he was sold on to Port Vale for a £6,500 fee in October 1963. In April 1965 he was allowed to join Southport, where he again won promotion out of the fourth tier in 1966–67. Following this he joined Altrincham, where he lifted the Northern Premier League Challenge Cup in 1970.

Career
Smith had trials with Stoke City, but after his discharge from National service he was signed to Liverpool on amateur terms in 1955. He turned professional in 1957, but left the club for Bournemouth & Boscombe Athletic in 1959, having never turned out for the first team. He made his debut for Bournemouth in the Third Division against Reading in October 1959. He scored three goals in ten games in 1959–60, two goals coming from penalty kicks. He scored four times in thirty games in 1960–61, before he was transferred to Fourth Division side Crewe Alexandra in July 1961.

Establishing himself in the first team at Gresty Road in 1961–62 by missing just three league games, he helped the club to win promotion in third place in 1962–63, scoring five goals in forty league games. He played nine games in 1963–64 before he was once again moved on.

He was signed by Freddie Steele's Third Division Port Vale for £6,500 in October 1963. He was a regular from his inception in the side, and posted 39 appearances in 1963–64, scoring five goals. He lost his first team place on Boxing Day 1964, when he damaged an eye in a 3–0 defeat to Hull City. Upon his recovery he failed to regain his spot and was given a free transfer in April 1965, having scored twice in 28 appearances in 1964–65.

He moved on to Fourth Division Southport, who were managed by his former Vale teammate Billy Bingham. He was an ever-present in 1965–66, before he helped the "Sandgrounders" to win promotion as runners-up in 1966–67.

He was given a free transfer to Cheshire County League side Altrincham in 1967. After a second-place finish in 1967–68, the club became founder members of the Northern Premier League. He played 34 league games of the inaugural 1968–69 season, before he won the Northern Premier League Challenge Cup with the club in 1970, after victory over Macclesfield Town. He left the club at the end of the 1969–70 campaign. Upon leaving Moss Lane he turned out for Netherfield, then moved to Formby where he debuted in November 1975 a week after Alex Russell and played alongside his old Southport teammate Ambrose Clarke. He left the club for Fleetwood Hesketh. He stayed involved in Formby for many years, managing their reserves side, and later returned as first team manager in the mid 1980s, steering them to their second Liverpool Senior Cup final in 1985.

Career statistics
Source:

Honours
Crewe Alexandra
Football League Fourth Division third-place promotion: 1962–63

Southport
Football League Fourth Division second-place promotion: 1966–67

Altrincham
Northern Premier League Challenge Cup: 1970

References

Footballers from Liverpool
English footballers
Association football wingers
Stoke City F.C. players
Liverpool F.C. players
AFC Bournemouth players
Crewe Alexandra F.C. players
Port Vale F.C. players
Southport F.C. players
Altrincham F.C. players
Kendal Town F.C. players
Formby F.C. players
English Football League players
Northern Premier League players
1936 births
Living people